San Jose Cemetery, is a historic Mexican and Mexican American cemetery established between 1919 and 1922, in the Montopolis neighborhood of southeast Austin, Travis County, Texas, United States. It is also referred to as Cemeterio San José and Montopolis Cemetery.

History 
San Jose Cemetery was established between 1919 and 1922 by the Union Fraternal Mexicana. At the time of its establishment, the Montopolis area not included in the Austin city limits as it is today, and would not be until the 1950s. The area was largely rural, without essential services, and suffered from high crime rates. Moreover, segregation era politics prevented integrated cemeteries for people of color, specifically Latinx/Hispanic individuals in the case of San Jose Cemetery. As time went on, the cemetery has suffered from considerable neglect and illegal dumping activity.

In 2020, a research team based out of The University of Texas at Austin conducted research on the site investigating the linkage of the cemetery to pandemic-related deaths of the twentieth century.

The cemetery is composed of two sections: the first and original section, San Jose I, is located at 705 Montopolis Drive, and the second later addition, San Jose II, is located at 8101 Posten Lane off of Hoeke Lane.

Notes

Cemeteries in Texas
1919 establishments in Texas
Cemeteries in Austin, Texas
Culture of Austin, Texas
Hispanic and Latino American culture in Austin, Texas